Happurg is a municipality in the district of Nürnberger Land in Bavaria in Germany. During World War II, a subcamp of Flossenbürg concentration camp was located here.

Geography

Neighboring municipalities 
Neighboring municipalities and communities (to the north going clockwise) are: Pommelsbrunn, Alfeld, Lauterhofen, Offenhausen, Engelthal, and Hersbruck.

Geographic location 
The municipality lies in the eastern part of the Franconian Jura

References 

Nürnberger Land